Oleksandr Vasiuk (born 28 December 1994) is a Ukrainian politician and lawyer. He is a Member of the Ukrainian Parliament. and belongs the presidential faction named “Sluha Narodu” (Servant of the People), member of the Verkhovna Rada of Ukraine Committee on Legal Policy, head of the inter-factional parliamentary association "Ukraine-US Strategic Partnership".

Early life and education 
Oleksandr Vasiuk was born on December 28, 1994, in the city of Zaporizhzhia. Graduated from the Law Faculty of Yaroslav Mudryi Kharkiv Law University. During the presidential campaign in 2019, he coordinated the team of lawyers of the current President of Ukraine Volodymyr Zelenskyy.

Political career 
On August 2, 2022, Oleksandr Vasiuk was elected as a Member of the Ukrainian Parliament from party “Sluga Narodu”.

On August 30, 2022, he took the oath of office of the People's Deputy of Ukraine.

Oleksandr Vasiuk leads the Strategic Partnership Ukraine-USA coalition. He  is a top Ukrainian official responsible for overseeing dialogue with the US.

Oleksandr Vasiuk is a member of the Verkhovna Rada Committee on Legal Policy. He was elected head of the inter-factional deputy association "Ukraine-US Strategic Partnership".In recent years, the main goal is to expand the Ukrainian-American partnership based on a common vision of democracy, economic and social prosperity of both countries

See also 
List of members of the parliament of Ukraine, 2019–24

References 

Living people

1994 births
21st-century Ukrainian politicians
Servant of the People (political party) politicians
Politicians from Zaporizhzhia
Yaroslav Mudryi National Law University alumni
Ninth convocation members of the Verkhovna Rada